The raphidophytes, formally known as Raphidomonadea or Raphidophyceae (formerly referred to as Chloromonadophyceae and Chloromonadineae), are a small group of eukaryotic algae that includes both marine and freshwater species.  All raphidophytes are unicellular, with large cells (50 to 100 μm), but no cell walls.  Raphidophytes possess a pair of flagella, organised such that both originate from the same invagination (or gullet).  One flagellum points forwards, and is covered in hair-like mastigonemes, while the other points backwards across the cell surface, lying within a ventral groove.  Raphidophytes contain numerous ellipsoid chloroplasts, which contain chlorophylls a, c1 and c2.  They also make use of accessory pigments including β-carotene and diadinoxanthin.  Unlike other heterokontophytes, raphidophytes do not possess the photoreceptive organelle (or eyespot) typical of this group.

In terms of ecology, raphidophytes occur as photosynthetic autotrophs across a range of aquatic systems.  Freshwater species are more common in acidic waters, such as pools in bogs.  Marine species often produce large blooms in summer, particularly in coastal waters.  Off the Japanese coast, the resulting red tides often cause disruption to fish farms, although raphidophytes are not usually responsible for toxic blooms.

The position of this group varied in former classifications. Some protozoologists treated the chloromonads as an order within the phytoflagellates. Some phycologists classified them with the Xanthophyceae and the Eustigmatophyceae in the division Xanthophyta. Others considered them as related to the Chrysophyceae, Dinophyceae, or Cryptophyceae 

Recently, the heliozoan Actinophyrida was moved to the group.

Taxonomy
Classification based on Cavalier-Smith and Scoble 2013
 Class Raphidomonadea Silva 1980 emend. Cavalier-Smith 2013 [Raphidophyceae Chadefaud 1950 emend. Silva 1980 s.l.]
 [unplaced genera]
 Genus Psammamonas Grant et al. 2013
 Genus Chloromorum Tomas et al. 
 Subclass Raphopoda Cavalier-Smith 2013
 Order Commatiida Cavalier-Smith 1997
 Family Commatiidae Cavalier-Smith 2013
 Genus Commation Thomsen & Larsen 1993
 Order Actinophyrida Hartmann 1913 [Actinophrydia Kühn 1926; Actinophrydea Hartmann 1913]
 Family Actinosphaeriidae Cavalier-Smith 2013
 Genus Actinosphaerium Ritter von Stein 1857 [Camptonema Schaudinn 1894; Echinosphaerium Hovasse 1965] 
 Family Helioraphidae Cavalier-Smith 2013
 Genus Heliorapha Cavalier-Smith 2013
 Family Actinophryidae Dujardin 1841
 Genus Actinophrys Ehrenberg 1830 [Trichoda Müller 1773 nomen oblitum; Peritricha Bory de St.Vincent 1824 nomen dubium non Stein 1859] 
 Subclass Raphidophycidae Cavalier-Smith 2013 [Raphidophyceae Chadefaud 1950 emend. Silva 1980 s.s.; Chloromonadophyceae Rothmaler 1951; Raphidophyta]
 Order Raphidomonadales [Chattonellales Throndsen 1993; Chloromonadida; Chloromonadales; Raphidomonadida Heywood & Leedale 1983; Chloromonadina Klebs 1892]
 Genus Viridilobus Demir-Hilton et al. 2012
 Family Fibrocapsaceae Cavalier-Smith 2013
 Genus Fibrocapsa Toriumi & Takano 1973
 Family Haramonadaceae Cavalier-Smith 2013
 Genus Haramonas Horiguchi 1996
 Family Chattonellaceae Throndsen 
 Genus Oltmannsia Schiller 1925
 Genus Chlorinimonas Yamaguchi et al. 2010
 Genus Heterosigma Hada 1967 ex Hara & Chihara 1987
 Genus Chattonella Biecheler 1936 [Hornellia Subrahmanyan 1954; Hemieutreptia Hada 1974]
 Family Vacuolariaceae 
 Genus Swirenkoiamonas Skvortzov 1968
 Genus Vacuolaria Cienkowski 1870
 Genus Merotricha Mereschkowsky 1877
 Genus Gonyostomum Diesing 1866

References

Ochrophyta